Cativá is a corregimiento in Colón District, Colón Province, Panama with a population of 34,558 as of 2010. Its population as of 1990 was 19,101; its population as of 2000 was 26,621.

References

Populated places in Colón Province
Corregimientos of Colón Province